Nemanja Belić (born 24 April 1987) is a Serbian footballer who plays as a goalkeeper for Čukarički.

Club career
As like mostly footballers from Obrenovac, Belić made his first football steps with FK Obrenovac 1905, under coach Miodrag Arsović - Arsa. Although he started playing as a defensive midfielder, he became a goalkeeper accidentally. Belić was training with older generation, and after goalkeeper injured during the tournament played at Rudnik, Belić replaced him as a youngest in the team. Later, he was elected for the best goalkeeper of the tournament. After a brief period with Radnički Obrenovac, he moved to OFK Beograd, where he spent next 10 years. He was also loaned to Red Star Belgrade as a youngster. After returning to OFK Beograd, he signed a contract and joined the first team. However, he did not to receive a lot of confidence, after annealing at Palilulac and Sopot, he returned to Radnički Obrenovac.

At the beginning of 2012, Belić received a call from Donji Srem, when Bogić Bogicević, who was a goalkeeper too, recognized his potential. During the first season with club he was mostly used as a backup for a more experienced Dragan Starčević. After club promoted in the Serbian SuperLiga Belić received a chance, and started keeping standardly from the next season. Belić stayed with Donji Srem until the end of 2014–15 season, when club relegated to the Serbian First League again. In summer 2015, Belić signed with Metalac Gornji Milanovac. In summer 2017, Belić signed with Čukarički as a single player.

Career statistics

References

External links
 Nemanja Belić stats at utakmica.rs
 
 
 

1987 births
Living people
Serbian footballers
Serbian First League players
Serbian SuperLiga players
Association football goalkeepers
OFK Beograd players
FK Palilulac Beograd players
FK Radnički Obrenovac players
FK Donji Srem players
FK Metalac Gornji Milanovac players
FK Čukarički players